The Aberdeen Lynx are a Scottish ice hockey team who play in the Scottish National League (SNL).

Aberdeen Lynx Ice Hockey Club

Aberdeen Lynx Ic Hockey Club is a registered charity in Scotland. Focusing on junior development from learns to play all the way up to Under 19s and Seniors (SNL).

SNL Team 
The Head Coach is Jordan Leyden. Team Captain is Jack Durkacz. 
The Team have the highest average attendance in the SNL, with home games regularly selling out.

Reference

 Aberdeen Lynx on Eurohockey.net
 Aberdeen Lynx Roster
 Governing Body  -  Scottish Ice Hockey

External links
 Aberdeen Lynx official site

Ice hockey teams in Scotland
2005 establishments in Scotland
Ice hockey clubs established in 2005
Sports teams in Aberdeen